Jean Sarrazin (15 August 1770 – 11 November 1848) was a French general during the Revolutionary and Napoleonic Wars.

Born at Penne, Sarrazin joined the dragoons at sixteen and was rapidly promoted after 1792. He became adjutant-general of the Army of Sambre-et-Meuse in Italy in 1794, and was promoted to the rank of brigadier on 23 August 1798. He was a leader of the French expedition to support the Irish rebels in 1798, and distinguished himself at the Battle of Castlebar. Although intelligent and brave, his career was several times set back by his irascibility and vanity.

On 10 June 1810, Sarrazin went over to the British and revealed French weaknesses. Condemned in absentia to death by a conseil de guerre, he did not return to France until the Bourbon Restoration. He offered his services to Napoléon Bonaparte during the Hundred Days, but was thrown in prison. Pardoned in 1822, he went into exile in London and then Brussels, where he died.

Selected publications

Notes

References

1770 births
1848 deaths
French generals